The Tomahawk River is a river in the U.S. state of Wisconsin.

It is the largest tributary of the Wisconsin River in terms of flow.  It begins at Tomahawk Lake in southern Vilas County, flows through Oneida County, and terminates at Lake Mohawksin in Tomahawk.  It flows through the Willow Reservoir and Lake Nokomis (artificial reservoirs), and Kawaguesaga Lake and Minocqua Lake (natural lakes).

At one time the Tomahawk River was known as the Little Wisconsin River.  Historically it was part of the most important north-south travel route in Wisconsin for both Indians and non-Indians (fur traders).

References

External links

Rivers of Wisconsin
Bodies of water of Vilas County, Wisconsin
Rivers of Oneida County, Wisconsin
Rivers of Lincoln County, Wisconsin